Tusten Stone Arch Bridge is a historic stone arch bridge located at Tusten in Sullivan County, New York.  It was built in 1896 and has two round arches.  It measures 51.1 feet in length and 15 feet wide.  It crosses the Tenmile River near that river's junction with the Delaware River.

It was added to the National Register of Historic Places in 2000.

It is located within the Ten Mile River Boy Scout Reservation, which in turn is owned by the Boy Scout Councils of Greater New York.

References

Road bridges on the National Register of Historic Places in New York (state)
Bridges completed in 1896
Bridges in Sullivan County, New York
National Register of Historic Places in Sullivan County, New York
Stone arch bridges in the United States